Colin Boyd may refer to:

 Colin Boyd, Baron Boyd of Duncansby (born 1953), Scottish judge
 Colin Boyd (footballer) (born 1954), former Australian rules footballer